Beneden-Leeuwen is a town in the Dutch province of Gelderland. It is a part of the municipality of West Maas en Waal, and lies about 7 km east of Tiel, on the opposite (southern) bank of the river Waal.
Beneden-Leeuwen has 6,925 inhabitants on 1 July 2021. It is the Catholic part of the former village Leeuwen.

History 
It was first called Beneden-Leeuwen in 1986 to distinguish from Boven-Leeuwen. Leeuwen was first attested in the 12th century as Lewen, and means "settlement near burial hill". The village developed along the Waal. In 1898, a Catholic Church was built in Beneden-Leeuwen, and the village split in a Catholic (beneden) and a Protestant (boven) village. The St. Alphonsus de Liguori Church was built between 1898 and 1900. In 1840, the entire village of Leeuwen was home to 2,128 people. Windmill De Wielewaal is a grist mill built in 1857.

Notable people 
 Hanneke Hoefnagel (born 1988), gymnast
 Jona Lendering (born 1964), historian
 Marco Pastors (born 1965), politician
 Julian Sas (born 1970), blues rock musician
 Arno van Zwam (born 1969), footballer

Gallery

References

External links

Populated places in Gelderland
West Maas en Waal